Joseph E. Stoy is a British computer scientist. He initially studied physics at Oxford University. Early in his career, in the 1970s, he worked on denotational semantics with Christopher Strachey in the Programming Research Group at the Oxford University Computing Laboratory (now the Oxford University Department of Computer Science). He was a Fellow of Balliol College, Oxford. He has also spent time at MIT in the United States. In 2003, he co-founded Bluespec, Inc.

His book Denotational Semantics: The Scott-Strachey Approach to Programming Language Semantics (MIT Press, 1977) is now a classic text.

Stoy married Gabrielle Stoy, a mathematician and Fellow of Lady Margaret Hall, Oxford.

References

External links
 
 Program Verification and Semantics: The Early Work
 Strachey and the Oxford Programming Research Group: a talk by Joe Stoy on Christopher Strachey and the Oxford Programming Research Group.

Year of birth missing (living people)
Living people
Alumni of the University of Oxford
English computer scientists
Members of the Department of Computer Science, University of Oxford
Fellows of Balliol College, Oxford
Massachusetts Institute of Technology faculty
Formal methods people
Programming language researchers
Computer science writers
British expatriates in the United States